Alvin Valley is an American fashion designer. He is frequently referred to as the "King of Pants" due to his widely acclaimed designs in women's pants.

References

External links 
 Official website

American fashion designers
Living people
Year of birth missing (living people)